The Boston Garden-Arena Corporation was an American corporation that oversaw the operations of the Boston Garden from 1934 to 1973. It was formed when the Boston Arena Corporation gained control of the Boston Garden from the Madison Square Garden Corporation in 1934. From 1946 to 1950 it owned the Boston Celtics. In 1951 it purchased controlling interest in the Boston Bruins from Weston Adams. In 1953 it sold the Boston Arena to Samuel M. Pinsly for $398,000.  In 1973, the Boston Garden-Arena Corporation merged with Storer Broadcasting.

Members

Presidents
Henry G. Lapham (1934–1939 )
Raymond Lapham (1940–1941)
Walter A. Brown (1941–1942)
Tom Kanaly (1942–1945)
Walter A. Brown (1945–1964)
Edward J. Powers (1964 –1973)
Weston Adams, Jr. (1973)

General Managers
George V. Brown (1934–1937)
Walter A. Brown (1937–1942) 
Tom Kanaly Acting (1942–1945) 
Walter A. Brown (1945–1964) 
Edward J. Powers (1964–1973 )

Chairmen
Weston Adams (1951–1973)

Notable directors
Earl Blaik
Marjorie Brown 
Shelby Davis
Frederic C. Dumaine, Jr.
Sheldon Fairbanks
John S. Hammond
Huntington Hardwick 
Louis K. Liggett
John R. Macomber
Walter E. O'Hara
Bayard Tuckerman, Jr.
Herbert Tuckerman

References

Boston Bruins owners
Boston Celtics owners
Companies based in Boston
Real estate companies established in 1934
American companies disestablished in 1973
Boston Garden
1934 establishments in Massachusetts
1973 disestablishments in Massachusetts
American companies established in 1934